Panchasara Parshwanath temple is a Jain temple located in Patan, Gujarat. The temple was constructed in 8th century during the reign of Vanaraja Chavda of Chavda dynasty.

History 
Vanaraja Chavda (c. 746 CE to c. 780 CE), the most prominent ruler of the Chavda dynasty established the territory of Patan in 746 CE and built the Panchasara Parshwanath temple with main idol of Parshvanatha brought from Panchasar village.

During the rule of Chaulukya dynasty (or Solanki dynasty), Patan was a major pilgrimage centre of Jainism. There are more than 100 temples in the region. The temple was rebuilt in the 16th-17th century after destruction by Muslim invaders.

Temple 
This temple is one of the largest temple in Patan. The temple is dedicated to Shwetambar sect of Jainism. The temple is built with white marble with rich stonework with sacred carvings.
The domical ceiling is decorated by concentric circles of figures and bands of ornament with a lotus-shaped pendant extending from the dome of the center roof. The ceiling features eight bracket figures of musicians or dancers; between these figures are seated tirthankaras with yaksha and yakshi on either side.

In Shvetambara tradition, idols tends to derive their name from a geographical region, the Pañcásar Parshvanath is one of 108 prominent idols of Parshvanath idols. The temple also houses an idol of Vasupujya in padmasan position sitting on big lotus with long stalk. The idol has images of yakshi and yaksha on both sides and the sculpture is covered with foliage of Chaitya tree to commemorate the penance of Vasupujya. The temple also houses idols of Jain monk Kakkasuri, Devachandrasuri and Yashodevsuri. 

Hemachandrayacharya Jain Gyan Mandir is an ancient library built by Hemachandra.This library is one of the most important Jain libraries in Gujarat and the collection includes several ancient palm-leaf manuscripts. The temple also houses a paper manuscript of Parshvanathacaritra.

See also 
 Shankheshwar Jain Temple
 Roda Group of Temples

References

Citation

Sources

Book

Web 

 
 

8th-century Jain temples
Jain temples in Gujarat
Patan district